Per-Olof Brogren (born 17 April 1939) is a Swedish speed skater. He competed in two events at the 1960 Winter Olympics.

References

1939 births
Living people
Swedish male speed skaters
Olympic speed skaters of Sweden
Speed skaters at the 1960 Winter Olympics
Sportspeople from Gothenburg